Mieczysław Tracz (15 November 1962 – 2 September 2019) was a Polish wrestler. He competed in the men's Greco-Roman 62 kg at the 1988 Summer Olympics.

References

1962 births
2019 deaths
Polish male sport wrestlers
Olympic wrestlers of Poland
Wrestlers at the 1988 Summer Olympics
People from Żary
Sportspeople from Lubusz Voivodeship